Mesodesmatidae is a family of saltwater clams, marine bivalve mollusks in the order Venerida.

Genera
 Amarilladesma M. Huber, 2010
 Anapella Dall, 1895
 Atactodea Dall, 1895
 Coecella Gray, 1853
 Davila Gray, 1853
 Donacilla Philippi, 1836
 Mesodesma Deshayes, 1832
 Monterosatus : synonym of Planktomya Simroth, 1896
 Paphies Lesson, 1830
 Regterenia Rooij-Schuiling, 1972
 Soleilletia Bourguignat, 1885

References

 Powell A. W. B., New Zealand Mollusca, William Collins Publishers Ltd, Auckland, New Zealand 1979 
 
 

 
Bivalve families